Fabienne Müller-Lütkemeier (born 28 October 1989 in Paderborn, West Germany) is a German dressage rider. Representing Germany, she has won gold medals in team dressage at the 2013 European Dressage Championship in Herning and at the 2014 World Equestrian Games in Normandy. Meanwhile, her current best individual championship result is 10th from the European Championships in 2013.

Lütkemeier also competed at two editions of World Cup Finals (in 2015 and 2016). At the 2015 edition she placed 10th aboard Qui Vincit Dynamis. The following year she placed 6th aboard D'Agostino.

She is a niece of Nadine Capellmann, 2002 World Champion in dressage and the daughter of Gina Capellmann, a multiple championship medalist.

Dressage results

World Championships
1 medal (1 gold, 0 silver, 0 bronze)

European Championships
1 medal (1 gold, 0 silver, 0 bronze)

World Cup

Final

Western European League

Q - denotes qualification for the World Cup Final

Western European League podiums
5 podiums (1 gold, 2 silver, 2 bronze)

Personal bests

References

External links 
 
 
  

1989 births
Living people
German female equestrians
German dressage riders
Sportspeople from Paderborn